Zedekiah Smith Barstow (October 4, 1790 – March 1, 1873) was an American minister and educator. He had served as a trustee for Dartmouth College.

Biography 
Barstow, the youngest child of Deacon John and Susannah (Smith) Barstow, was born in Canterbury, Connecticut, October 4, 1790. Having previously prepared himself in the mathematics and the higher English branches, while working on his father's farm, he commenced the study of the classics at the age of 19, with Rev. Erastus Learned, of Canterbury, and after six months of persevering study, was admitted to Yale College in 1811, where he graduated in 1813. 

Barstow married, August 1818, Elizabeth Fay Blake, eldest daughter of Elihu Blake, of Westborough, Massachusetts, who died September 15, 1869. Two sons only of their five children survived them.

After graduation he pursued his theological studies under the direction of President Dwight, and was licensed to preach in New Haven in 1814. For two years he was tutor and college chaplain in Hamilton College, where he received the degree of A.M. (ad eundem) 1816, and was invited to accept a professorship, but declined, preferring to devote his life to pastoral work. He was settled over the Congregational Church in Keene, New Hampshire, July 1, 1818. On July 1, 1868, he resigned his charge, after 50 years of pastoral service, during which long period he had failed to preach but eight Sabbaths. 

For 37 years he served as trustee of Dartmouth College (never missing attendance on a single meeting of the Board during his term of service); he was secretary for many years of the General Association of New Hampshire, a corporate member of the A. B. C. F. M., trustee of Kimball Union Academy, trustee and secretary of Keene Academy until his death, and prominent in all the educational and religious movements of the day. He was also member of the New Hampshire Legislature, and chaplain of that body in 1868 and 1869. He received the degree of Doctor in Divinity from Dartmouth College in 1849.

After his resignation he still continued to preach for destitute parishes in the vicinity until within a year of his death, which occurred in Keene, March 1, 1873, in the 83d year of his age. Barstow's influence as a pastor, a scholar, and a public man will long be felt not only in the town where he lived, but throughout the State.

References

External links

1790 births
1873 deaths
People from Canterbury, Connecticut
Yale College alumni
Hamilton College (New York) faculty
American Congregationalist ministers
19th-century American clergy